Lian Po (– 229 BC), was a prominent general of the Zhao state in the Warring States period of Chinese history. He was named by Chinese historians as one of the four greatest generals of the late Warring States period, along with Bai Qi, Wang Jian and Li Mu. In his early years as a general, he won multiple battles, which made him become famous among all the generals in the Warring States period.

Life

In Lian Po's early years, he had victories in the wars against Qi and Wei. Lin Xiangru, a minister of Zhao, was disliked by Lian Po, because of his rapid rise to power and genius. But Lin Xiangru, in several famous incidents, took great steps to avoid Lian Po; in one case he even turned from Lian Po's carriage rather than block the great general's route. Eventually, all this began to cause shame and embarrassment to Lian Po, and he carried sharp brambles on his shoulder without clothing and asked Lin Xiangru to forgive him. Afterward, they became good friends. The chengyu of "Carrying Thorned Grass and Pleading Guilt", meaning "to offer someone a humble apology, requesting punishment and forgiveness", is derived from this story. 

During the Battle of Changping, he became the commander of Zhao. Deciding not to risk his forces by engaging in open battle with the Qin, under their feared general Bai Qi, Lian Po instead built a series of forts along the Changping area, successfully stalemating the invasion of Qin. However, King Xiaocheng of Zhao (趙孝成王), under the persuasion of many courtiers (most of whom were bribed heavily by Qin spies) became dissatisfied with Lian Po's strategy, and decided to replace him with Zhao Kuo (趙括). Being the son of another famous Zhao general, Zhao She, Zhao Kuo discarded Lian Po's cautious, defensive strategy and attacked with full strength. Consequently, he was defeated, and Zhao never returned to prominence.

After the Battle of Changping, Lian Po became the commander of Zhao's army again to stop the invasion of Yan. He defeated the Yan army, but in his later years, he was distrusted by the King of Zhao. Therefore, he decided to escape to Wei, and then to Chu.

When the Zhao army led by General Hu Zhe was defeated and massacred by the Qin army led by General Huan Yi in 234 BCE, he offered once again his services as a general to the state of Zhao. Still, he was rejected by the Zhao court due to political disputes, and they decided instead to appoint as commander-in-chief of the Zhao forces another brilliant General named Li Mu.

He died in Shouchun, the capital of the Chu state, living long enough to see the gradual demise of the country he once served.

Popular culture
In the manga and anime Kingdom, he is known as "Ren Pa" and despite his often cheerful personality, he's widely considered one of the most feared and respected Generals across China, a former member of the previous generation of the "Three Great Heavens of Zhao". 

Proficient in different types of warfare, he's one of the most well-rounded and versatile generals as he performs equally well as an instinctive-type general (discerning and setting the 'flow' of battle as opposed to strategy or careful planning), a strategist-type general (an archetypal schemer), in offence (a vanguard/front-liner) and defence (counter-siege). 

He left Zhao after he disagreed with King Daoxiang's tyrant method of leadership. He then went to Wei, but ended up being exiled after his defeat by Qin, after that he settled in Shouchun, in Chu. There, he still remains an honourable "guest" in the Chu state.

References

 

 Year of birth unknown
 Year of death unknown
 Zhou dynasty generals
Zhao (state)
3rd-century BC Chinese people